Cnemaspis rajabasa is a species of gecko endemic to southern Sumatra in Indonesia.

References

Cnemaspis
Reptiles described in 2015